Malkara, town and district in the Tekirdağ Province in Marmara region in Turkey

It may also refer to:

Malkara (missile), a type of  anti-tank missile developed by Australia and the United Kingdom
Malkara, an aboriginal word for "shield"
Malkara loricata, species of spiders of the Malkaridae family

See also
Malkaram, a village in Andhra Pradesh, India
Malkera, a census town in Jharkhand, India
Mankara, a village and gram panchayat in Palakkad district in the state of Kerala, India